Buttran is a small village located in the Bhogpur tehsil of Jalandhar district in the Punjab, India. The village is dominated by the Jatt people of Buttar clan.

Demographics

In 2001, according to the census then, the village had the total population of 1,580 with 295 households, 827 males and 753 females. Thus the males constitutes 52% and females 48% of the population with the sex ratio of 910 females per thousand males.

Culture

The majority of the villagers belongs to the Buttar clan of Jatts. Punjabi is the mother tongue as well as the official language here.

Religion

Sikhism is the main religion followed by villagers, with a minority of Hindus. Gurudwaras located in the village are the main religious sites.

References

Villages in Jalandhar district